

1920

Non-circulating coins

1921

Non-circulating coins

1922

Non-circulating coins

1923

Non-circulating coins

1924

Non-circulating coins

1925

Non-circulating coins

Medals

1926

Non-circulating coins

1927

Non-circulating coins

1928

Non-circulating coins

References

Bibliography 

 

Commemorative coins of the United States